Kostyantyn Mykolayovych Derevlyov (born 11 July 1983) is a Ukrainian amateur and former professional footballer who plays with Feniks Pidmonastyr in the Ukrainian Amateur League.

Playing career 
Derevlyov began his in 2000 with FC Lviv in the Ukrainian First League, and played in the Ukrainian Second League with FC Karpaty-2 Lviv, and FC Karpaty-3 Lviv. In 2001, he played with FC Sokil Zolochiv and won promotion for the club to the first league. He played in the country's top tier the Ukrainian Premier League with FC Arsenal Kyiv. He returned to the first league in 2003 to play with CSKA Kyiv, and won the league title with FC Hoverla Uzhhorod during the 2003/2004 season. During his time in the first league he played with FC Skala Stryi, FC Spartak Sumy, and FC Enerhetyk Burshtyn.

He returned to the second league in 2007 to play with FC Arsenal-Kyivshchyna Bila Tserkva, where he played for four seasons and won a promotion to the first league. In 2010, he had a stint with FC Naftovyk-Ukrnafta Okhtyrka, and won the second league title in 2011 with FC Poltava. He went across the border to Poland to sign with Hetman Żółkiewka in the III liga. He returned to Ukraine to play in the lower leagues with FC Rukh Vynnyky, and NK Veres Rivne. In 2016, he went overseas to Canada to sign with FC Ukraine United of the Canadian Soccer League. In his debut season he recorded 9 goals in 21 matches and secured a postseason berth for the club by finishing second in the standings. He featured in the quarterfinal match against Brantford Galaxy and contributed by scoring a goal in a 3-0 victory.[5]Their opponents in the next round were the Serbian White Eagles, but were eliminated from the playoffs by a 1-0 loss.[13]

References

External links
Personal statistics at UAF website

1983 births
Living people
Sportspeople from Lviv
Ukrainian expatriate footballers
Ukrainian footballers
FC Lviv (1992) players
FC Lviv players
FC Karpaty Lviv players
FC Karpaty-2 Lviv players
FC Karpaty-3 Lviv players
FC Arsenal Kyiv players
FC CSKA Kyiv players
FC Hoverla Uzhhorod players
FC Hazovyk-Skala Stryi players
FC Enerhetyk Burshtyn players
FC Spartak Sumy players
FC Arsenal-Kyivshchyna Bila Tserkva players
FC Naftovyk-Ukrnafta Okhtyrka players
FC Poltava players
FC Rukh Lviv players
NK Veres Rivne players
FC Ukraine United players
Ukrainian Premier League players
Ukrainian First League players
Ukrainian Second League players
Canadian Soccer League (1998–present) players
Expatriate soccer players in Canada
Expatriate footballers in Poland
Association football midfielders
III liga players